Niroshana Amarasinghe (born 26 September 1982) is a Sri Lankan former cricketer who played in 33 first-class and 22 List A matches between 2001 and 2011. He made his Twenty20 debut on 17 August 2004, for Tamil Union Cricket and Athletic Club in the 2004 SLC Twenty20 Tournament. He is now an umpire, and has stood in matches in the 2018–19 Premier Limited Overs Tournament.

References

External links
 

1982 births
Living people
Sri Lankan cricketers
Sri Lankan cricket umpires
Kurunegala Youth Cricket Club cricketers
Moratuwa Sports Club cricketers
Panadura Sports Club cricketers
Sebastianites Cricket and Athletic Club cricketers
Tamil Union Cricket and Athletic Club cricketers